Edna May Oliver (born Edna May Nutter, November 9, 1883 – November 9, 1942) was an American stage and film actress. During the 1930s, she was one of the better-known character actresses in American films, often playing tart-tongued spinsters.

Career
Born in Malden, Massachusetts, the daughter of Ida May and Charles Edward Nutter, Oliver quit school at age 14 to pursue a stage career. 

She achieved her first success in 1917 on Broadway in Jerome Kern's musical comedy Oh, Boy!, playing the hero's comically dour Aunt Penelope. In 1925, Oliver appeared on Broadway in The Cradle Snatchers, costarring Mary Boland, Gene Raymond, and Humphrey Bogart. Oliver's most notable stage appearance was as Parthy, wife of Cap'n Andy Hawks, in the original 1927 stage production of the musical Show Boat. She reprised her role in the 1932 Broadway revival, but turned down the chance to play Parthy in the 1936 film version to play the Nurse in that year's film version of Romeo and Juliet.

Her film debut was in 1923 in Wife in Name Only. She continued to appear in films until Lydia in 1941. She first gained major notice in films for her appearances in several comedies starring the team of Wheeler & Woolsey, including Half Shot at Sunrise, her first film under her RKO Radio Pictures contract in 1930. Usually in featured parts, she starred in ten films, including Fanny Foley Herself (1931) and Ladies of the Jury (1932). She played wealthy, domineering Aunt March in the 1933 version of Little Women.

Oliver's most popular star vehicles were mystery-comedies, starring as spinster sleuth Hildegarde Withers from the popular Stuart Palmer novels. The series ended prematurely when she left RKO to sign with Metro-Goldwyn-Mayer in 1935; the studio attempted to continue the series with Helen Broderick and then ZaSu Pitts as Withers.

While at MGM, David O. Selznick cast Oliver in two film versions of novels by Charles Dickens, as the prim, acidic Miss Pross A Tale of Two Cities (1935), starring Ronald Colman, and as the title character's eccentric aunt, Betsy Trotwood in David Copperfield (also 1935).

She appeared in the Shirley Temple film Little Miss Broadway (1938) as the landlord of a hotel for vaudevillians who wants to shut it down. She also performed in two 1939 movie musicals: with Tyrone Power in the Sonja Henie skating film Second Fiddle, and in a supporting role as the agent of the title characters in the Fred Astaire/Ginger Rogers musical The Story of Vernon and Irene Castle. A 1940 comic performance as Laurence Olivier's Mr. Darcy's domineering aunt Lady Catherine de Bourgh in Pride and Prejudice and a 1941 role as Merle Oberon's grandmother in Lydia concluded her film career.

She was also cast in noncomedic films such as Cimarron (1931), Ann Vickers (1933), and Romeo and Juliet (1936).

Death
Oliver died on her 59th birthday in 1942 following a short intestinal ailment, and was interred in the Forest Lawn Memorial Park Cemetery in Glendale, California.

Awards and honors
Oliver received an Oscar nomination for Best Supporting Actress for her performance in Drums Along the Mohawk (1939).

Stage
(This list is limited to New York/Broadway theatrical productions.)

Filmography

References

Bibliography

Further reading

External links

 
 
 

1883 births
1942 deaths
Actresses from Massachusetts
American film actresses
American silent film actresses
American stage actresses
People from Malden, Massachusetts
RKO Pictures contract players
20th-century American actresses
Burials at Forest Lawn Memorial Park (Glendale)
Deaths from digestive disease